The UVG Urbanstar was a step-entrance and low-entry midibus body built by the Universal Vehicles Group in Waterlooville, England on Dennis Dart and Dart SLF chassis. The first examples were delivered to Provincial in Southampton in December 1995.

In 1998 the design rights were purchased by Salvador Caetano who continued to build it as the Caetano Compass. It was mainly sold to small provincial operators, although Limebourne purchased 34 for use on London Regional Transport contracted services.

A common feature about the Urbanstar/Compass was that it has a rounded roof dome (more rounded as compared to the Nimbus), a double-curvature windscreen and a separately mounted destination display. It was superseded by the Caetano Nimbus in 1999.

References

External links

Buses of the United Kingdom
Midibuses
Step-entrance buses
Low-entry buses
Single-deck buses